General elections were held in Bermuda on 22 May 1968. The result was a victory for the United Bermuda Party, which won 30 of the 40 seats in the House of Assembly. The Progressive Labour Party increased its representation by four to ten.

On 10 June 1968, Henry Tucker became the territory's first Premier.

Electoral system
Four additional constituencies were created since the 1963 election. The election was the first held under equal universal suffrage, as the additional vote for property owners used in the 1963 election was scrapped, and the voting age lowered from 25 to 21.

Results

References

Bermuda
1968 in Bermuda
Elections in Bermuda
Election and referendum articles with incomplete results